Wanderson Miranda Francisco (born 8 February 1990 Santo Amaro da Imperatriz, Santa Catarina), known simply as Wanderson, is a Brazilian professional footballer who plays as a midfielder for GD Oliveira de Frandes.

External links

Wanderson at KTFF
Wanderson at ZeroZero

1990 births
Living people
Sportspeople from Santa Catarina (state)
Brazilian footballers
Brazilian expatriate footballers
Association football midfielders
Tercera División players
Liga Portugal 2 players
Football League (Greece) players
Liga I players
Segunda Divisão players
Criciúma Esporte Clube players
Terrassa FC footballers
F.C. Vizela players
S.C. Braga players
G.D. Ribeirão players
C.F. União players
Panachaiki F.C. players
CSM Corona Brașov footballers
FC Dinamo București players
CSM Reșița players
AD Fafe players
Expatriate footballers in Slovenia
Expatriate footballers in Spain
Expatriate footballers in Portugal
Expatriate footballers in Greece
Expatriate footballers in Romania
Expatriate footballers in Cyprus
Brazilian expatriate sportspeople in Slovenia
Brazilian expatriate sportspeople in Spain
Brazilian expatriate sportspeople in Portugal
Brazilian expatriate sportspeople in Greece
Brazilian expatriate sportspeople in Romania
Brazilian expatriate sportspeople in Cyprus